The 2008 Gent–Wevelgem was a road cycling race that took place in Belgium on April 9, 2008. Spaniard Óscar Freire won in a tightly contested bunch sprint and beat Swiss racer Aurélien Clerc who finished a close second.

Results

Individual 2008 UCI ProTour standings after race

External links
2008 in Road Cycling

Gent-Wevelgem
Gent-Wevelgem
Gent–Wevelgem